Suzanne is a 1932 French drama film directed by Léo Joannon and Raymond Rouleau and starring Pauline Carton, Louis Florencie and Yves Gladine.

Cast
 Pauline Carton as Mme Batonné  
 Louis Florencie
 Yves Gladine 
 Jean-Max 
 Joachim 
 Yolande Laffon 
 Véra Markels 
 Raymonde Mickel 
 Raymond Rouleau

References

Bibliography 
 Dayna Oscherwitz & MaryEllen Higgins. The A to Z of French Cinema. Scarecrow Press, 2009.

External links 
 

1932 drama films
French drama films
1932 films
1930s French-language films
Films directed by Léo Joannon
Films directed by Raymond Rouleau
French black-and-white films
1930s French films